17α-Dihydroequilenin, or α-dihydroequilenin, also known as 6,8-didehydro-17α-estradiol, as well as estra-1,3,5(10),6,8-pentaen-3,17α-diol, is a naturally occurring steroidal estrogen found in horses which is closely related to equilin, equilenin, and 17α-estradiol, and, as the 3-sulfate ester sodium salt, is a minor constituent (1.2%) of conjugated estrogens (Premarin).

See also
 List of estrogens § Equine estrogens

References

Secondary alcohols
Estranes
Estrogens